István Verpecz (born 4 February 1987 in Szikszó) is a Hungarian football player who currently plays for Szombathelyi Haladás. He made one appearance in the Hungarian League Cup during the 2007–08 season.

Club career

Debrecen
Verpecz won the 2009–10 season of the Hungarian League with Debrecen despite his team lost to Kecskeméti TE in the last round. In 2010 Debrecen beat Zalaegerszegi TE in the Hungarian Cup final in the Puskás Ferenc Stadium by 3–2.

On 1 May 2012 Verpecz won the Hungarian Cup with Debrecen by beating MTK Budapest on penalty shoot-out in the 2011–12 season. This was the fifth Hungarian Cup trophy for Debrecen.

On 12 May 2012 Verpecz won the Hungarian League title with Debrecen after beating Pécs in the 28th round of the Hungarian League by 4–0 at the Oláh Gábor út Stadium which resulted the sixth Hungarian League title for the Hajdús.

Club statistics

Updated to games played as on 19 May 2019.

Honours
Debrecen
 Hungarian League (2): 2010, 2012
 Hungarian Cup (2): 2010, 2012

References

External links
 Profile
 

1987 births
Living people
People from Szikszó
Hungarian footballers
Association football goalkeepers
Debreceni VSC players
Paksi FC players
Balmazújvárosi FC players
Szombathelyi Haladás footballers
Nemzeti Bajnokság I players
Nemzeti Bajnokság II players
Sportspeople from Borsod-Abaúj-Zemplén County